The Supreme Court of Arkansas is the highest court in the state judiciary of Arkansas. It has ultimate and largely discretionary appellate jurisdiction over all state court cases that involve a point of state law, and original jurisdiction over a narrow range of cases. The Supreme Court holds the power of judicial review, the ability to invalidate a statute for violating a provision of the Arkansas Constitution. It is also able to strike down gubernatorial directives for violating either the Constitution or statutory law. However, it may act only within the context of a case in an area of law over which it has jurisdiction.

Established by Article Five of the 1836 Constitution, the Supreme Court was composed of three judges, to include a chief justice, elected to eight-year terms by the General Assembly. As later set by Act 205 of 1925, it consists of the Chief Justice of Arkansas and six associate justices. Justices are elected in non-partisan elections to eight-year terms, staggered to make it unlikely the Court would be replaced in a single election. Vacancies are filled by gubernatorial appointment.

When a vacancy occurs, the governor, with the advice and consent of the Senate, appoints a new justice. Each justice has a single vote in deciding the cases argued before the Court. When in majority, the chief justice decides who writes the opinion of the court; otherwise, the most senior justice in the majority assigns the task of writing the opinion.

The Court meets in the Supreme Court Building in Little Rock, Arkansas.

Membership

There are currently seven justices on the Supreme Court: Chief Justice Dan Kemp and six associate justices.

Further reading
Distinguishing the Righteous from the Roguish: The Arkansas Supreme Court, 1836–1874 by J. W. Looney, 2016, University of Arkansas Press

References

External links 

 
 
 

 
1836 establishments in Arkansas
Arkansas state courts
Courts and tribunals established in 1836
Ark